Francisco Javier Meza Palma (born in Barranquilla, August 29, 1991) is a Colombian football player who plays for Colombian club Atlético Bucaramanga as a center back.

Club career

Santa Fe
After several years in the youth teams of Independiente de Santa Fe, Meza debuted with the first team at the age of 19 under coach Arturo Boyacá on April 16, 2011. In his first year as a professional, he played over 30 games. That year in the Copa Sudamericana, Santa Fe reached the quarterfinals. In 2012, Meza continued as a starter in the defense, making his first professional goal on February 26, 2012 in a Colombian league match against Deportes Quindío. Santa Fe eventually won the Apertura Tournament, where under the command of Wilson Gutiérrez, ended the drought of 36 years without league titles.

In 2013, he started in the Superliga final against Millionarios, where Santa Fe would be crowned champions, with Meza as one of the most impressive players. In that same year, he played his first Copa Libertadores and his second international tournament - after the Copa Sudamericana 2011-; in this tournament the club reached semifinals. In addition, Santa Fe reached the final of the Colombian League.

In 2014, he scored a goal for Santa Fe to win the first leg against Independiente Medellín; what helped the team to become champions. In 2015, Meza won his second Superliga title, by defeating Atlético Nacional. In that same year, under the command of Gustavo Costas, Santa Fe reached the quarterfinals of the Copa Libertadores. On May 12, 2015, he converted his first goal in Copa Libertadores against Real Garcilaso. On December 9, 2015, Meza won his first international title with Santa Fe after being crowned 2015 Copa Sudamericana champions.

Tigres UANL
On 11 June 2015, it was official that Meza would have signed with Liga MX team Tigres UANL, but he would be joining the team until January 2016. In the meantime, he would continue playing for Independiente Santa Fe for the next 6 months.

Tigres finished the regular season of the Apertura 2017 as second place with 32 points. In play-offs, Tigres tied 1–1 in both legs against Club León and by an aggregate of 2-2, secured semifinals due table position. In semifinals, Tigres defeated Club América by 1–0 in the away game and 3–0 in home. Tigres played the historical final against archrival CF Monterrey. In the first leg the teams tied by 1–1 at the Estadio Universitario (UANL). In the Estadio BBVA Bancomer, Tigres beat Monterrey by 2–1. Meza and Eduardo Vargas scored the goals.

Pumas UNAM
On 3 December 2015, Pumas UNAM agreed to sign Meza in a season-long loan deal from Tigres UANL.

International career
Meza was named in Colombia's squad for a 2018 FIFA World Cup qualifier against Argentina in November 2015.

Honours 

Santa Fe
Copa Sudamericana    : 2015
Categoría Primera A  : 2012-I, 2014-II
Superliga Colombiana : 2013, 2015

UANL
 Liga MX: Apertura 2016, Apertura 2017, Clausura 2019
 CONCACAF Champions League: 2020

References

External links
 
 

1991 births
Living people
Colombian footballers
Colombian expatriate footballers
Categoría Primera A players
Liga MX players
Independiente Santa Fe footballers
Tigres UANL footballers
Expatriate footballers in Mexico
Colombian expatriate sportspeople in Mexico
Sportspeople from Barranquilla
Association football central defenders
20th-century Colombian people
21st-century Colombian people